Albania has an embassy in Vienna and 7 honorary consulates in Eisenstadt, Gössendorf, Graz, Grödig, Salzburg, St. Pölten and Villach. Austria has an embassy in Tirana. The history of diplomatic relations of Albania and Austria dates back to 1912, when Albania declared its independence on November 28, 1912. As a European Union (EU) member, Austria supports Albania in its euro-integration path.

Cooperation 

Diplomatic relations between Albania and Austria have traditionally been close and are currently governed by a complex set of treaties (including those with the European Union (EU), of which Austria is a member).

(Place - Year - Object or Treaty)

 Tirana 1973 - Passenger and Carriage on the Road 
 Vienna 1987 - Cooperation Agreement in Culture, Science, Technology 
 Tirana 1991 - Development assistance
 Tirana 1992 - Travel Documents, Visas
 Vienna 1993 - Investment protection
 Vienna 1993 - Aviation
 Vienna 1994 - Economical and Industrial co-operation, Investments
 Vienna 1998 - Cultural and Historical buildings and monuments protection
 Tirana 2005 - Cooperation Agreement in Culture, Science, Technology 
 Vienna 2007 - Customs Agreement
 Tirana 2007 - International Security
 Tirana 2007 - Double taxation
 Tirana 2008 - Development assistance
 Vienna 2010 - Health
 Tirana 2010 - Financial aid
 Vienna 2012 - Scientific and Technical cooperation
 Both 2012 - Culture, Education and Science
 Vienna 2013 - Refugee and Migration control

Visits

Gallery

Diplomacy

Republic of Albania
Vienna (Embassy)

Republic of Austria
Tirana (Embassy)

See also 
 Foreign relations of Albania
 Foreign relations of Austria

References

External links 
 Albanian Embassy in Vienna
 

 
Austria 
Bilateral relations of Austria